The women's team competition at the 2011 European Judo Championships was held on 24 April at the Abdi İpekçi Arena in Istanbul, Turkey.

Results

Repechage

References

External links
 

Wteam
EU 2011
European Women's Team Judo Championships
Euro